Sincerely, Jan Howard is the thirteenth studio album by American country music artist Jan Howard. The album was released in 1975 on GRT Records and was produced by Larry Butler. It was Howard's first studio album to be issued outside of a major record label. The album would also spawn three singles, one of which charted on the Billboard country songs list.

Background and content
Sincerely was Howard's first album release since departing from Decca Records in 1973. It was recorded in March 1975 at the Jack Clement Studio, located in Nashville, Tennessee. It was Howard's first album to be produced by Larry Butler. The album featured part of The Nashville A-Team musicians, whom had previously been featured on her Decca releases. These musicians included Ray Edenton and Hargus "Pig" Robbins.

The album consisted of 10 tracks previously unrecorded by Howard. Among these tracks was a cover of Tanya Tucker's "Would You Lay with Me (In a Field of Stone)" and the standard "You'll Never Know". The record's eighth track, "The Wedding Song", was co-written by Howard herself.

Release
Sincerely was officially released in 1975 via GRT Records. It was issued in a vinyl record format, with five songs on the record's first side and five songs on the album's opposite side. Sincerely has since not been reissued since its initial release.

The album would spawn three singles between 1974 and 1975. Its first single was its fourth track, "Seein' Is Believin'". Released in 1974, the song was the album's only single to chart on the Billboard Hot Country Singles chart, reaching number 96 in November 1974. Sincerely did not chart among any Billboard lists upon its release.

Track listing

Personnel
All credits are adapted from the liner notes of Sincerely, Jan Howard.

Musical and technical personnel
 Larry Butler – producer
 Kenneth Buttrey – drums
 Jimmy Capps – guitar
 Curly Chalker – steel guitar
 Ray Edenton – guitar
 Lloyd Green – steel guitar
 Jan Howard – lead vocals
 Dave Kirby – guitar
 Kenny Malone – drums
 Bob Moore – bass
 Weldon Myrick – steel guitar
 Hargus "Pig" Robbins – piano
 Henry Strzelecki – bass

Release history

References

1975 albums
Jan Howard albums
Albums produced by Larry Butler (producer)